Brimstone Peak may refer to:
 Brimstone Peak (South Shetland Islands)
 Brimstone Peak (Victoria Land)